Captain William Grant Spruell Stuart  (8 June 1889 – 23 April 1917) was a Scottish first-class cricketer and British Army officer.

Career
The son of the South African The Reverend W. Stuart, he was born in June 1889 at Gartly, Aberdeenshire. He was educated at George Watson's College, before going up to the University of Edinburgh to read classics. A member of the Watsonian Cricket Club, Stuart also played his club cricket for East and West of Scotland. He was selected to play for Scotland in a first-class match against Ireland at Dublin in 1914. He batted twice in the match and was dismissed for scores of 17 and 10 by Bob Lambert and Gus Kelly respectively.

Stuart volunteered for the British Army during the First World War, being commissioned as a second lieutenant in the Queen's Own Cameron Highlanders in September 1914, with promotion to lieutenant following in April 1915. He was promoted to captain in December 1916 and was awarded the Military Cross in the 1917 New Year Honours. Stuart served with his regiment's 7th (Service) Battalion and was killed in action while attempting to capture Guémappe during the Battle of Arras on 23 April 1917. He was buried at the Faubourg d'Amiens Cemetery in Arras.

References

External links

1880s births
1917 deaths
People from Aberdeenshire
Scottish people of South African descent
People educated at George Watson's College
Alumni of the University of Edinburgh
Scottish cricketers
Queen's Own Cameron Highlanders officers
British Army personnel of World War I
Recipients of the Military Cross
British military personnel killed in World War I
British Army cricketers
Cricketers from Aberdeenshire